Chico Hamilton Quintet is a live album by drummer and bandleader Chico Hamilton, released on the Pacific Jazz label.

Reception

AllMusic rated the album 3 stars.

Track listing
 "I Know (Theme)" (Jim Hall) - 0:55
 "Chanel #5" (Carson Smith) - 4:36
 "Beanstalk" (Smith) - 5:13
 "September Song" (Kurt Weill, Maxwell Anderson) - 3:32
 "Siete-Cuartro" (Hall) - 4:51
 "Mr. Jo Jones" (Chico Hamilton) - 3:11
 "I Know (Theme)" (Hall) - 0:34
 "Satin Doll" (Duke Ellington) - 4:35
 "Lillian" (Freddy Catts) - 4:54
 "Reflections" (Fred Katz) - 5:20
 "Soft Winds" (Benny Goodman) - 4:48
 "Caravan" (Duke Ellington, Irving Mills, Juan Tizol) - 3:20
 "I Know (Theme)" (Hall) - 0:34

Personnel
Chico Hamilton - drums
Paul Horn - tenor saxophone, alto saxophone, flute, clarinet 
Fred Katz - cello 
John Pisano - guitar 
Carson Smith - bass

References 

Pacific Jazz Records live albums
Chico Hamilton live albums
1957 live albums